NWN may refer to:

As an abbreviation:
 Neverwinter Nights, a Dungeons & Dragons-based video game series
Newton for Hyde railway station, a railway station in England
 North Williamstown railway station, Melbourne, a railway station in Australia
 New Wrestling Nation, a Canadian professional wrestling promotion based in Île-des-Chênes
 Newbury Weekly News, an English local weekly newspaper
 NW Natural, a natural gas distributor in Portland, Oregon

In religion:
 An alternate spelling for the Egyptian god Nu